Protodeltote distinguenda is a species of moth of the family Noctuidae first described by Otto Staudinger in 1888. It is found in Korea, Taiwan and Japan.

The length of the forewings is 9–13 mm. The forewings are dark brown, sprinkled with rufous. The hindwings are white sprinkled with brown.

References

Moths described in 1888
Acontiinae
Moths of Japan